Absolute Classic Masterpieces Volume II is the fourth compilation album by English alternative rock band Felt, released in 1993. It collects tracks from the band's singles and albums recorded for Creation Records between 1986 and 1988.  The album comprises two CDs; the first contains single tracks only and the second contains album tracks. Tracks 3 and 7 of the first disc are instrumental, as are tracks 1-4 and 13-16 of the second disc.

Track listing

Personnel
Lawrence – vocals, guitar
Martin Duffy – organ, piano, backing vocals, synthesizer
Gary Ainge – drums, bongos
Marco Thomas – bass, guitar
John Rivers – backing vocals
Neil Scott – guitar
Richard Thomas – saxophone, cymbal
Robin Guthrie – bass
Francis Sweeney – viola, violin
Rose McDowell – vocals
Tony Willé – guitar
Mick Bund – bass

References 

Felt (band) albums
Creation Records albums